Kingston Central is a parliamentary constituency represented in the House of Representatives of the Jamaican Parliament. It elects one Member of Parliament MP by the first past the post system of election.

Boundaries 

The constituency covers the Allman Town and Rae Town areas of Kingston.

Members of Parliament

1944 to 1959

1962 to 1976

1989 to present

Elections

References

Parliamentary constituencies of Jamaica